Lars Nordwall (22 September 1928 – 27 October 2004) was a Swedish cyclist. He competed at the 1952 and 1956 Summer Olympics.

References

External links
 

1928 births
2004 deaths
Swedish male cyclists
Olympic cyclists of Sweden
Cyclists at the 1952 Summer Olympics
Cyclists at the 1956 Summer Olympics
People from Örnsköldsvik Municipality
Sportspeople from Västernorrland County
20th-century Swedish people